Olivia Asselin (born 24 February 2004) is a Canadian freestyle skier who competes internationally in the big air and slopestyle disciplines.

Career 
Asselin joined the national team in 2019.  Asselin won the bronze medal at the 2022 Winter X Games in the big air event.

On January 24, 2022, Asselin was named to Canada's 2022 Olympic team in the big air and slopestyle events.

References

External links 
 

2004 births
Living people
Canadian female freestyle skiers
Sportspeople from Quebec City
Freestyle skiers at the 2022 Winter Olympics
Olympic freestyle skiers of Canada